The Wythenshawe and Sale East by-election was a by-election held on 13 February 2014 for the Parliament of the United Kingdom's House of Commons constituency of Wythenshawe and Sale East, following the death of the former MP, Paul Goggins.

The election was won by Mike Kane of the Labour Party with a greatly increased share of the vote compared with the 2010 general election. UKIP, which had previously performed poorly, came second, beating the Conservative Party into third place. The Liberal Democrats lost their deposit. The turnout was 28.2%, compared with 54.3% for the 2010 general election.

Background
On 30 December 2013, Goggins became seriously ill after collapsing while running. He died in hospital on 7 January 2014 following complications from a brain haemorrhage.

Candidates and result

Applications to register to vote had to be received by Manchester City Council by 28 January. The Statement of Persons Nominated was published at 5 pm on 29 January 2014.

The result was declared at around 2.30am GMT on Friday, 14 February.

Mike Kane, a former Manchester councillor and the acting chief executive of Movement for Change, was confirmed as the Labour Party candidate, on 24 January. In a selection process described as "quick-fire", London interviews on 22 January produced a short list of five local councillors and ex-councillors: Rosa Battle and Suzannah Reeves of Manchester City Council, Catherine Hynes and Sophie Taylor of Trafford Borough, and Mike Kane.

The Wythenshawe branch of the Conservative Party chose Daniel Critchlow, a Trafford-based vicar, on 23 January 2014.

The Liberal Democrats chose a Manchester City councillor, Mary di Mauro, on 26 January 2014.

On 24 January 2014, the British National Party announced Eddy O'Sullivan as its candidate. O'Sullivan had been a candidate in Salford local elections and stood for the BNP at the 2012 Manchester Central by-election, where his party's share of the vote was reduced.

The UK Independence Party selected John Bickley, 60, a former Labour supporter who grew up in Wythenshawe. Bickley, who runs a mobile app firm, told The Guardian that he felt Parliament needed to "take responsibility" having "outsourced running of the country to the EU". Bickley added that he felt "Labour had let down the working class" and that Labour's behaviour would mean his former trade unionist father would be "turning in his grave".

The Green Party selected Nigel Woodcock, a further education lecturer at The Manchester College.

The Official Monster Raving Loony Party put forward Captain Chaplington-Smythe as its candidate on 25 January 2014.

Polling

Previous result

1This is compared to Worthington's performance as the Socialist Alternative candidate at the prior election.

See also

List of United Kingdom by-elections
Opinion polling for the next United Kingdom general election
Opinion polling for the next United Kingdom general election in individual constituencies

References

External links

Wythenshawe and Sale East by-election
Wythenshawe and Sale East by-election
Wythenshawe and Sale East by-election
Wythenshawe and Sale East 2014
Wythenshawe and Sale East 2014
2010s in Greater Manchester